The Royal Enfield Interceptor 650 is a parallel twin retro-styled  motorcycle introduced by Royal Enfield in 2018. It is the first modern twin cylinder motorcycle developed by the company.

In 2017 it was revealed, inspired by the 1960s Interceptor which had a 750cc engine. The Interceptor 650 was unveiled alongside the Continental GT 650, which shares the same engine. The Interceptor is a retro-cruiser with relaxed ergonomics, while the Continental GT is a café-racer with minor changes for performance. Both models are sold in India, Australasia, Europe and the United States. The bike is expected to become the biggest selling large-capacity twin in the world, and in 2020 the Interceptor 650 was the UK's best-selling big bike.

Design
The bike was designed at Royal Enfield's Technology Centre at Bruntingthorpe Proving Ground in Leicestershire, England.

Both models, Interceptor and Continental GT, share the same engine, frame, suspension, wheels, brakes, exhausts and silencers. The engine is a wet-sump, 648 cc, air-cooled SOHC, 8v, parallel twin. Fuelling is via Bosch injection and engine management. The low 9.5:1 compression ratio will help the engine tolerate lower-octane fuel. The crankshaft has a 270° Crank, with a gear-driven balance shaft ahead of the crank. The slipper clutch drives a six-speed gearbox and chain final drive. The cylinder head receives substantial oil-cooling and the bikes have a large oil cooler on the frame downtubes. Producing a modest 47bhp @ 7250 rpm, the engine is capable of future development: Bike magazine reported that "the crankshaft's substantial bearing area and the hefty alloy crankcases suggest that the engine could comfortably deliver more power. Compression, capacity and revs could be raised on future models".

The chassis is a tubular twin-downtube cradle frame. Forks are standard telescopics (without gaiters); and rear suspension is via twin shocks(5 step adjustable). The ABS brakes comprise single discs: 320mm (front) and 240mm (rear). Instruments are conventional twin-dial analogue items with digital fuel gauge and trip display.

Interceptor
The Interceptor is a conventionally-styled roadster with dual seat, a rounded 13.7 litre saddle tank with a Royal Enfield classic badge and a Monza-style fuel cap. The braced handlebars and more forward-set footrests allow a sit-up-and-beg riding position, and a tubular grab-rail is fitted for the pillion passenger. The Interceptor is marketed as the INT650 in the United States where Honda has a trademark on the Interceptor name.

Continental GT
The Continental GT café racer has either a standard dual-seat or an optional solo seat with a seat hump. The fuel tank is more angular than the roadster's. Clip-on handlebars and rear-set pegs allow a sportier riding position.

Reception
The Interceptor was favourably reviewed by Motorcycle News which stated, "As an overall package, the Royal Enfield Interceptor is great. The engine is lively without being intimidating, the handling is fun without being patronising and the finish is good without breaking the bank". The bike's engine, brakes, and equipment were all praised, but the suspension was criticised as basic, being too soft and underdamped. The Australian website, MC-News also gave a favourable report.

See also
 Royal Enfield Interceptor
 270° parallel twins
 The crossplane concept

References

External links
Royal Enfield Interceptor 650 (archived)

Interceptor
Motorcycles introduced in 2017
Standard motorcycles